Vatica nitens is a species of plant in the family Dipterocarpaceae. It is a tree found in Peninsular Malaysia and Borneo. It is an endangered species threatened by habitat loss.

References

nitens
Trees of Peninsular Malaysia
Trees of Borneo
Endangered plants
Taxonomy articles created by Polbot